Cyperus whitmeei is a species of sedge that is native to parts of Samoa.

See also 
 List of Cyperus species

References 

whitmeei
Plants described in 1936
Flora of Samoa
Taxa named by Georg Kükenthal